The Olef is a river in Liège, Belgium and North Rhine-Westphalia, Germany. It flows through the Eifel Mountains in the western part of the Germany and eastern part of Belgium.

Geography 
From here it flows initially northwest and through the woods of the Dreiherren Wald. The valley of the Olef forms the state border here which runs along the river. From its confluence with the Wiesbach it enters Germany. It then forms inter alia, the eastern boundary of the safety zones of the Elsenborn Military Training Area. The river course changes direction in a wide arc to head east.

In the next section the Olef flows through the Schleiden Forest (Forst Schleiden) and is impounded to create the Olef Reservoir in front of Hellenthal. In Hellenthal it is joined from the right and southwest by the Platißbach. At the end of the village of Hellenthal, near Kirschseiffen, the river turns north. At the northern edge of Blumenthal it picks up the Reifferscheider Bach from the right. Other villages en route are Oberhausen, Schleiden, Olef, Nierfeld and Gemünd.

Along its 27.9-kilometre-long route the Olef descends through 335 metres, which represent an average riverbed gradient of 12 ‰. It drains an area of

Tributary streams 

References

External links 
 

Rivers of the Ardennes (Belgium)
Rivers of North Rhine-Westphalia
Rivers of Belgium
Rivers of Liège Province
Büllingen
Rivers of the Eifel
Rivers of Germany
Belgium–Germany border
International rivers of Europe
Border rivers